Schelkovnikov's pine vole (Microtus schelkovnikovi) is a species of rodent in the family Cricetidae. It is found in Azerbaijan and Iran. It has recently been considered the sole species in the subgenus Hyrcanicola.

References

Musser, G. G. and M. D. Carleton. 2005. Superfamily Muroidea. pp. 894–1531 in Mammal Species of the World a Taxonomic and Geographic Reference. D. E. Wilson and D. M. Reeder eds. Johns Hopkins University Press, Baltimore.
Nadachowski, A. 2007. The taxonomic status of Schelkovnikov's Pine Vole Microtus schelkovnikovi (Rodentia, Mammalia). Acta zoologica cracoviensia 50A(1-2):67-72.

Microtus
Mammals of Azerbaijan
Vole, Schelkovnikov's Pine
Mammals described in 1907
Taxa named by Konstantin Satunin
Taxonomy articles created by Polbot